Shahriyar II (Persian: شهریار) was the eleventh ruler of the Bavand dynasty from 930 to 964. He was the son and successor of Sharwin II. 

After the fall of the Zaydids of Tabaristan, Shahriyar II became involved in a power struggle between the Buyids and Ziyarids for the Tabaristan region. The Ziyarid ruler of Tabaristan, Vushmgir, is known to have married the sister of Shahriyar. In 943, Vushmgir was expelled from Ray by the Buyid by Rukn al-Dawla, and took refugee in the court of Shahriyar II. In 948, Rukn al-Dawla conquered Tabaristan, and forced Shahriyar to swear allegiance to the Buyids in person. However, Shahriyar still remained loyal to the Ziyarids and their Samanid overlords. Because of his pro-Ziyarid policies, Shahriyar was deposed in favor of his pro-Buyid brother Rustam II in 964. Shahriyar later tried to reclaim the Bavand throne by invading Tabaristan with a Samanid army in 968, but to no avail.

Sources 
 
 

Bavand dynasty
10th-century monarchs in Asia
10th-century Iranian people